Baissea is a genus of plant in the family Apocynaceae found in tropical Africa.  the World Checklist of Selected Plant Families recognises 18 species:

Species

References

 
Apocynaceae genera
Flora of Africa